Ale de Boer (born 28 August 1987) is a Dutch former football player.

Club career
De Boer played professionally for Eerste Divisie side SC Cambuur.

Cambuur released him in 2010 with him joining Topklasse side Harkemase Boys. A year later he moved on to ONS Sneek.

De Boer retired from football in 2019 after eight years with ONS Sneek.

References

1987 births
Living people
People from Dantumadiel
Footballers from Friesland
Association football defenders
Dutch footballers
SC Cambuur players
Eerste Divisie players
Derde Divisie players
ONS Sneek players
Harkemase Boys players